Mikiela Nelson (born 27 November 1997) is a Canadian rugby union player.

Nelson competed for Canada at the delayed 2021 Rugby World Cup in New Zealand. She scored a try in Canada's opening match against Japan. She also scored a try against the United States.

References 

Living people
1997 births
Female rugby union players
Canadian female rugby union players
Canada women's international rugby union players